Qush Tappeh (also Romanized as Qūsh Tappeh; also known as Ooch Tappeh, Ūch Tappeh, and Ūch Tappen) is a village in Nahr-e Mian Rural District, Zalian District, Shazand County, Markazi Province, Iran. At the 2006 census, its population was 454, in 114 families.

References 

Populated places in Shazand County